Solomon Wolf Golomb (May 30, 1932 – May 1, 2016) was an American mathematician, engineer, and professor of electrical engineering at the University of Southern California, best known for his works on mathematical games. Most notably, he invented Cheskers (a hybrid between chess and checkers) in 1948 and coined the name. He also fully described polyominoes and pentominoes in 1953. He specialized in problems of combinatorial analysis, number theory, coding theory, and communications. Pentomino boardgames, based on his work, would go on to inspire Tetris.

Achievements 
Golomb, a graduate of the Baltimore City College high school, received his bachelor's degree from Johns Hopkins University and master's and doctorate degree in mathematics from Harvard University in 1957 with a dissertation on "Problems in the Distribution of the Prime Numbers".

While working at the Glenn L. Martin Company he became interested in communications theory and began his work on shift register sequences. He spent his Fulbright year at the University of Oslo and then joined the Jet Propulsion Laboratory at Caltech, where he researched military and space communications. He joined the faculty of USC in 1963 and was awarded full tenure two years later.

Golomb pioneered the identification of the characteristics and merits of maximum length shift register sequences, also known as pseudorandom or pseudonoise sequences, which have extensive military, industrial and consumer applications. Today, millions of cordless and cellular phones employ pseudorandom direct-sequence spread spectrum implemented with shift register sequences. His efforts made USC a center for communications research.

Golomb was the inventor of Golomb coding, a form of entropy encoding.  Golomb rulers, used in astronomy and in data encryption, are also named for him, as is one of the main generation techniques of Costas arrays, the Lempel-Golomb generation method.

He was a regular columnist, writing Golomb's Puzzle Column in the IEEE Information Society Newsletter. He was also a frequent contributor to Scientific American'''s Mathematical Games column (The column did much to publicize his discoveries about polyominoes and pentominoes) and a frequent participant in Gathering 4 Gardner conferences.  Among his contributions to recreational mathematics are Rep-tiles. He also contributed a puzzle to each issue of the Johns Hopkins Magazine, a monthly publication of his undergraduate alma mater, for a column called "Golomb's Gambits", and was a frequent contributor to Word Ways: The Journal of Recreational Linguistics.

 Awards 
Golomb was a member of both the National Academy of Engineering and the National Academy of Science.

In 1985, he received the Shannon Award of the Information Theory Society of the IEEE.

In 1992, he received the medal of the U.S. National Security Agency for his research, and has also been the recipient of the Lomonosov Medal of the Russian Academy of Science and the Kapitsa Medal of the Russian Academy of Natural Sciences.

In 2000, he was awarded the IEEE Richard W. Hamming Medal for his exceptional contributions to information sciences and systems. He was singled out as a major figure of coding and information theory for over four decades, specifically for his ability to apply advanced mathematics to problems in digital communications.

Golomb was one of the first high profile professors to attempt the Ronald K. Hoeflin Mega IQ power test, which originally appeared in Omni Magazine. He scored at least IQ 176, which represents  of the unselected population.

In 2012, he became a fellow of the American Mathematical Society. That same year, it was announced that he had been selected to receive the National Medal of Science.  In 2014, he was elected as a fellow of the Society for Industrial and Applied Mathematics "for contributions to coding theory, data encryption, communications, and mathematical games."

In 2013, he was awarded the National Medal of Science 2011.

In 2016, he was awarded the Benjamin Franklin Medal in Electrical Engineering "for pioneering work in space communications and the design of digital spread spectrum signals, transmissions that provide security, interference suppression, and precise location for cryptography; missile guidance; defense, space, and cellular communications; radar; sonar; and GPS."

Selected booksSignal Design for Good CorrelationPolyominoes, Princeton University Press; 2nd edition 1996, Shift Register Sequences'', San Francisco, Holden-Day, 1967.

See also
Golomb graph
Golomb sequence
Polyomino

References

External links
Biography of Dr. Golomb at the USC Electrical Engineering Department's website
 

1932 births
2016 deaths
20th-century American mathematicians
21st-century American mathematicians
Combinatorial game theorists
Recreational mathematicians
Mathematics popularizers
Harvard Graduate School of Arts and Sciences alumni
American information theorists
Johns Hopkins University alumni
Number theorists
University of Southern California faculty
Baltimore City College alumni
Tetris
Chess variant inventors
National Medal of Science laureates
Fellows of the American Mathematical Society
Members of the United States National Academy of Engineering
Members of the United States National Academy of Sciences
20th-century American Jews
Fellows of the Society for Industrial and Applied Mathematics
Burials at Mount Sinai Memorial Park Cemetery
Mathematicians from Maryland
21st-century American Jews